Poularde Albufera, (Albufera Pullet) is a chicken dish attributed to French chef Adolphe Dugléré which was named in honour of the Duke of Albufera.  It consists of poached chicken (poularde) with a garnish of vol-au-vents filled with quenelles, cocks' kidneys, mushrooms and truffles in Albufera sauce.

See also
 List of chicken dishes

References

French chicken dishes